Chris Cole (born October 12, 1977 in Orange, Texas) is a former National Football League wide receiver for the Denver Broncos.

Early years 
Cole was a standout athlete at West Orange-Stark High School in Orange, Texas.  In 1995, his senior season, he caught 53 passes for 860 yards and 14 touchdowns, helping lead his team to the Texas Class 4A State Football regional finals.  Cole was also a member of the school's track and field team, and qualified for the Texas State Track and Field Championships in long jump and triple jump.

Cole was recruited by R. C. Slocum to play wide receiver for Texas A&M University. He lettered all four years that he played football for the Aggies (1996–1999). His 89 career receptions still rank at No. 10 on the school's all-time list.  His most productive season came as a junior in 1998, when he led the Aggies in catches (38), receiving yards (667) and touchdowns (five). He totaled 89 passes caught for 1,383 yards and 8 touchdowns.

NFL career 
Cole was selected by the Denver Broncos in the third round of the 2000 NFL Draft, as the 70th pick overall. He played four seasons for the Broncos, with his best season coming in 2001.  That year, he played in all 16 of the Broncos' games, logging 9 receptions for 128 yards. His 48 kickoff returns that season tied the all-time single-season Broncos record, and he ranked third in the AFC with a 23.5-yd average.

On April 7, 2004, Cole signed with the Oakland Raiders as a free agent, but did not make the team's regular-season roster.  In 2005, Cole spent the offseason and preseason with the Jacksonville Jaguars, who released him on August 30, 2005.

In all, Cole played 35 games in the NFL, starting 2.  He caught 12 passes for 164 yards, returned 89 kickoffs for a total of 2,105 yards, and made 17 tackles while playing on special teams.

Post-NFL 
In May 2006, Cole signed with the Canadian Football League's Edmonton Eskimos.  He was released shortly thereafter, and in November he signed a one-year free agent contract with the Arena Football League's Los Angeles Avengers.  On April 1, 2008, Cole signed with the CFL's Toronto Argonauts. He has since returned to Texas A&M University to pursue his degree in Sociology.

Family and personal life 
In March 2002, Cole's first child was born, Makenna Turner. She is currently a student at Stanford University, having won many awards as a black female in STEM.

References 

1977 births
Living people
People from Orange, Texas
American football wide receivers
American football return specialists
Texas A&M Aggies football players
Denver Broncos players
Oakland Raiders players
Jacksonville Jaguars players
Edmonton Elks players
Los Angeles Avengers players
Toronto Argonauts players